The 2014 Brabantse Pijl was the 54th edition of the Brabantse Pijl road cycling race. Held on 16 April 2014, it started in Leuven and ended  later in Overijse. It was a 1.HC-ranked race that was part of the 2014 UCI Europe Tour. The main difficulty in the race was caused by 26 climbs, as well as the finishing climb in on the Schavei.

The race was won by Philippe Gilbert in a bunch sprint. Michael Matthews finished second and Tony Gallopin third.

Results

References

External links 
 

Brabantse Pijl
Brabantse Pijl
2014
Articles containing video clips